Edgerton House, at 514 W. Gunnison Ave. in Gunnison, Colorado, was listed on the National Register of Historic Places in 1998.

The property includes three contributing buildings: a two-story boarding house/hotel which closed in 1931, a lunch counter/cafe which operated from 1898 to 1929, and a privy.

See also
National Register of Historic Places listings in Gunnison County, Colorado

References

Hotels in Colorado
National Register of Historic Places in Gunnison County, Colorado